Desmond Fa'aiuaso (born 24 February 1984) is a Football striker from Samoa who currently plays for Vailima Kiwi. He currently has both the most caps and the most goals for his home country, Samoa.

Career

Club
Fa'aiuaso had his first stint in international football with Tahiti side A.S. Pirae and signed up with YoungHeart Manawatu for the 2009–10 season to form an all South Pacific strikeforce with Vanuatuan striker Seule Soromon. He was the first Samoan to play for New Zealand's national league.

International
He made his debut for Samoa in an April 2001 FIFA World Cup qualification match against Tonga and scored four goals in his second international, against American Samoa.

In 2016 he coached the Samoan national team.

Rugby
In 2004 Fa'aiuaso was selected for the Samoa national rugby sevens team for the 2004 Hong Kong Sevens. He was Samoa's top try-scorer in the tournament. In April 2004 he was named to the Samoan team for an Under-21 Rugby World Cup qualifying against Fiji. He was named in the sevens team for the 2007 Dubai Sevens.

Career statistics

International

Statistics accurate as of match played 4 September 2015

International goals
Scores and results list. Samoa's goal tally first.

References

External links
 
 Player profile – YoungHeart Manawatu
 NZFC stats – NZFC
 

1984 births
Living people
Samoan footballers
Samoa international footballers
YoungHeart Manawatu players
A.S. Pirae players
Kiwi FC players
2016 OFC Nations Cup players
Samoan expatriate footballers
Expatriate association footballers in New Zealand
Samoan expatriate sportspeople in New Zealand
Association football forwards
Samoa international rugby sevens players